Auckland Grammar School (often simplified to Auckland Grammar, or Grammar) is a state, day and boarding secondary school for boys in Epsom, Auckland, New Zealand. It was established in 1868.

The school was originally situated on Howe Street in Freeman’s Bay, where Auckland Girls Grammar School is now located. It moved to its current site on Mountain Road in Epsom in 1916. As of 2020, it has 2606 students, making it the third largest school in New Zealand. The current headmaster, Tim O’Connor, who was appointed in 2012, received a Blake Leader Award in 2007.

History 
The school was endowed in 1850 by the then Governor-in-Chief, Sir George Grey, and was recognised as an educational establishment in 1868 through the Grammar School Appropriation Act. It officially opened in 1869 in old Immigration Barracks site in Howe Street with 78 boys enrolled. The school was initially privately funded, as New Zealand did not have a state education system until 1877.

A growing roll caused the school to move twice in the 1870s, and in 1880, it moved to Symonds Street where it remained for 35 years. The site today houses the University of Auckland’s School of Architecture. The economic impact of the 1880s depression meant girls from Girls High School then joined what was by then called the Auckland College and Grammar School. In 1909, Auckland Girls Grammar School opened on the original Howe Street site and the renamed Auckland Grammar School became an all boys school again. In 1916, the school moved to its current location in Mountain Road, Epsom which was opened by Governor General Arthur Foljambe the Earl of Liverpool.

Auckland Grammar School buildings contain two Category I historic places, the school's main block and a war memorial. An obelisk located in front of the school commemorates former students who fought in various wars. The school's main block, built in 1916 in the Spanish Mission style, is used for daily assemblies, exhibitions, and contains classrooms on its two levels. Surrounding the main hall in which students sit for daily assemblies are the school honours boards listing the names of the school's top scholars.

In the early 20th Century, inmates from the neighbouring Mount Eden Prison worked at two stone quarries adjacent to the school, and were involved in the construction of the 1916 school building itself. Early prisoners were used as labourers to quarry stone for use in road construction around Auckland, including the quarries at Maungawhau / Mount Eden and Auckland Grammar School. The flat land was redeveloped into sports fields for Auckland Grammar School, after the closure of the quarries in the 1960s. These compensated the school somewhat for the loss of its main rugby field which became motorway.

The school owns a facility called the VentureLodge located in the township of Ohakune, in the central North Island, which is used by students for camps.

The school has also translated the motto as "Through rough ravines to hallowed heights.", and "from trials to triumph" The origin of the motto is uncertain, but it was a common maxim at the time of the school's founding.

A documentary on the school titled Grammar Boys was aired in July 2005 on TV3.

Architecture 

The main building was constructed in 1916, designed by the architectural firm of Arnold & Abbott. It, and the adjacent caretakers residence are in the Spanish Mission style. Following the completion of the main building, three smaller buildings were constructed in the same style; the library block to the north, the gymnasium to the south and a toilet block adjoining the main building. In the 1950s, a large science block was constructed to the south of the main block in a modern style with metal windows. Further to the south again is a concrete block from the early 1970s raised on Pilotis to give access to the upper playing fields. Between it and the 1920 gymnasium is a large gymnasium which was constructed in the mid 1970s and opened by the Prime Minister Robert Muldoon.

Adjacent to the Spanish Mission Style Library from the 1920s is the Centennial Theatre (opened 1969) and the swimming pool. This abuts the Motorway, the construction of which in the 1960s removed some of the School's land to the north. Between the 1970s and 2014-2015, a complex of 'prefabs' adjacent to the Mountain Road boundary evolved, built to house the increasing roll, but following the development of a new classroom block in 2015 , these have now been almost entirely removed. The loss of playing space on the upper part of the school property meant new sports fields need to be created in two former quarries at a lower level than the original school. Each has a sports pavilion. The pavilion on the upper field was rebuilt soon after.

Between 2014 and 2015, the toilet block adjoining the main building was demolished and a new building constructed in its place for classroom use.

The school’s 150th century anniversary capital project is Te Ara Matauranga. Te Ara will include a new library, swimming pool and study block located in between the Centennial Theatre and the War Memorial. It is expected to cost $13.5 million.

Enrolment 

Historically, entry was selective to the school. The school was zoned at least since the 1960s. Since 2000, school zoning is determined by a state school enrollment scheme, which gives first preference to students living in a designated home zone, and then to brothers of current students who live outside the zone. The school argues that zoning increases house prices in the zone, reducing access to the school for students from lower socio-economic groups. Research by the Real Estate Institute of New Zealand shows there is a 30 percent premium ($257,000) on houses in-zone compared to those out of zone. In 2014, nearby One Tree Hill College and Selwyn College introduced enrollment schemes which initially planned to overlap parts of the Auckland Grammar zone. Both were forced to backtrack after opposition from parents in the overlapping areas, who feared it could ultimately lead to Auckland Grammar shrinking its zone and affecting the resale value of their homes.

Auckland Grammar's requested voluntary donation is the highest for a non-integrated state school in New Zealand. In 2014, the requested donation reached $1,050 per student per year. The school claimed the donation is high to cover the gap in government funding between it, a decile 9Q school, and the lowest decile schools (i.e. decile 1A). As a comparison, Auckland Grammar's female counterpart, Epsom Girls' Grammar School, asks for a donation of $665, despite also being decile 9Q.

International students are tested for English language proficiency and some students may be required to complete an intensive course of English language before starting at Auckland Grammar School. The international students at Auckland Grammar School paid the highest tuition fees in New Zealand state schools at more than $20,000 each year.

Academics 
As a state school, Auckland Grammar School is required to follow the New Zealand Curriculum (NZC).

Results 
In 2015, 95.1 percent of students leaving Auckland Grammar held at least NCEA Level 1 or IGCSE, 91.6 percent held at least NCEA Level 2 or AS level, and 81.5 percent held at least NCEA Level 3 or A level. This is compared to 87.1%, 76.3%, and 45.8% respectively for boys nationally.

In its regular survey of Auckland’s schools, Metro in 2011 reported that Auckland Grammar’s academic results are comparable with most private schools and that it scores very well in the National Scholarship exams. In its 2016 report, the Education Review Office reported that the school continued to achieve high-education outcomes for its students. It was ranked seventh in the Crimson-QS Best New Zealand schools in 2019 for entrance into top-ranked universities.

NCEA 
The previous headmaster, John Morris, is a vocal critic of NCEA. In response to what is perceived by the school to be a poorly designed system being forced on them, the school introduced Cambridge International Examinations in 2002, offering the IGCSE, AS Level and A2 examinations to its more talented students. Other students sit NCEA exams. Students placed in an IGCSE/AS/A2 class are allowed to switch to NCEA, but this is usually discouraged by the school. However, in the ensuing years the majority of students were encouraged to take part in CIE qualifications. The introduction of New Zealand Scholarship has been viewed skeptically by the school, and it encourages only the top students to attempt it. Despite this, the school had the highest number of scholarships of any school in New Zealand in 2006.
The 2008 Education Review Office (ERO) report commented the School ranks among the highest performing schools in New Zealand from the results in national and international examinations. From 2011, the school offered the CIE Form 5 programme to all students in Form 5. From 2019, the School  replaced all external examinations (both Cambridge IGCSE and NCEA Level 1) for Fifth Formers with an in-house preparatory qualification, Pre-Q, set to be "more rigorous than IGCSE", in response to planned reforms to NCEA, abolishing external examinations at Level 1.

School song 
The school song was introduced in March 1955. The words were composed in 1954 by L. W. A. Crawley, senior Classics lecturer at Auckland University College (now the University of Auckland). The song consists of two verses in Latin and includes the school motto as a refrain. It is sung to the melody of the German hymn "Ein feste Burg ist unser Gott" ("A Mighty Fortress Is Our God").

Headmasters 
The following individuals have served as headmaster of Auckland Grammar School:

Chairmen of the Board of Governors/Board of Trustees 
The following individuals have served as the Chairman of the Board of Governors and Chairmen of the Auckland Grammar School Board of Trustees:

Notable alumni

Academia

The arts

Broadcasting 
 John Hawkesby, news presenter

Business

Literature

Military 
 Cyril Bassett, Victoria Cross Recipient
 Ray Hanna, fighter pilot
 Leslie Potter, WW2 Commander

Public service

Science

Sport 
, Auckland Grammar has produced the most All Blacks out of any New Zealand school; it has a total of over 50 former All Blacks.

Notable staff 
 Ian Billcliff, cricketer, master
 Henry Cooper, educator, 8th headmaster
 John Etty, historian, author, associate headmaster
 John Graham, former rugby union player, educator, 9th headmaster
 Duncan Grant, former rower, former mathematics teacher
 Graham Henry, former master and rugby coach of Auckland, Wales, British and Irish Lions and All Blacks 
 John Morris, former footballer, educator, 10th headmaster
 Willie Rickards, former rugby union coach, former rugby union player, master
 Lindsay Tait, former professional basketball player, director of basketball, head coach of premier basketball
 James Tibbs, educator, 4th headmaster

See also 
 Grammar school § New Zealand

References

Bibliography

External links 

 
 Education Review Office (ERO) reports for the school
 Biography of past Headmaster J.W. Tibbs

Mission Revival architecture
Secondary schools in Auckland
Boys' schools in New Zealand
Boarding schools in New Zealand
Cambridge schools in New Zealand
Heritage New Zealand Category 1 historic places in the Auckland Region
Educational institutions established in 1868
1868 establishments in New Zealand